Copernicia ekmanii is a palm which is endemic to northern Haiti.

References

ekmanii
Trees of Haiti
Endemic flora of Haiti
Endangered plants
Taxa named by Max Burret